Hits Alive is the title of a greatest-hits album package released by American country music artist Brad Paisley. This album contains two CDs of a collection of Paisley's greatest hits spanning his entire career. The first disc contains studio versions, and the second disc contains live versions. It was released on November 2, 2010, on Arista Nashville. It sold 31,000 copies in its first week. As of the chart dated April 16, 2011, the album has sold 235,881 copies in the US.

Content
The album contains both studio versions as well as live versions of Paisley's greatest hits. Disc one contains studio versions of fourteen of his songs, including a special piano mix of "Then."  Disc two contains live versions of eleven of his songs recorded while Paisley was on The H2O Tour 2010.

The only single from Hits Alive is "Anything Like Me," which first appeared on his 2009 album American Saturday Night. The song debuted on country radio on August 16, 2010.

Track listing

Personnel

 Tom Baldrica – tuba on "Online"
 Eddie Bayers – drums
 Ron Block – banjo
 Brentwood High School Marching Band – marching band on "Online"
 Jim "Moose" Brown – clavinet, Hammond B-3 organ, piano
 Randle Currie – steel guitar
 Eric Darken – percussion
 Jerry Douglas – dobro
 Glen Duncan – fiddle
 Kevin "Swine" Grantt – bass guitar, upright bass
 James Gregory – bass guitar
 Scott Hamilton and the 12 Steps – background vocals on "Alcohol"
 Vicki Hampton – background vocals
 Jody Harris – electric guitar, background vocals
 Bernie Herms – piano
 Wes Hightower – background vocals
 Gary Hooker – 12-string acoustic guitar, acoustic guitar, baritone guitar, electric guitar, background vocals
 Mike Johnson – dobro, steel guitar
 Alison Krauss – viola and vocals on "Whiskey Lullaby"
 Tim Lauer – keyboards
 Kenny Lewis – bass guitar, background vocals
 Mitch McMitchen – percussion
 Kendall Marcy – banjo, Hammond B-3 organ, keyboards, piano, background vocals
 Gordon Mote – clavinet, Hammond B-3 organ, keyboards, piano, music box on "I'm Still a Guy"
 Brad Paisley – 12-string acoustic guitar, 12-string electric guitar, acoustic guitar, baritone guitar, electric guitar, mandolin, Tic tac bass, lead vocals
 Huck Paisley – vocals on "Anything Like Me"
 Dolly Parton – vocals on "When I Get Where I'm Going"
 Darius Rucker – vocals on "Alcohol (Live)"
 Ben Sesar – drums
 Bryan Sutton – mandolin
 Dan Tyminski – background vocals on "Whiskey Lullaby"
 Kris Wilkinson – viola
 Justin Williamson – fiddle, mandolin, background vocals

Charts and certifications

Weekly charts

Singles

Year-end charts

Certifications

References

2010 compilation albums
Brad Paisley albums
Arista Records compilation albums
Albums produced by Frank Rogers (record producer)